Chris Haddawy is an American entrepreneur, private currency advocate, and barter industry leader. He is the co-founder and executive vice president of BizX, a B2B digital alternative currency operator headquartered in Seattle, Washington.

Career

Bay Area & Hawaii Barter Exchange
Haddawy’s first role in the trade industry was as a sales person for the Bay Area and Hawaii Barter Exchange, where he was ultimately promoted to vice president of sales and marketing.

Barter Business Network
In 1995, Haddawy founded the Barter Business Network, later opening four offices in Nevada and California. BBN became one of the highest performing trade networks in America, and was acquired by BarterTrust in 1999.

BarterTrust
After BarterTrust purchased the Barter Business Network in 1999, Haddawy worked with the founding team to identify targets for acquisition, integrate acquired companies, and steer overall business strategy.

BizX
In 2002, Haddawy co-founded the BizXchange network with Bob Bagga and Raj Kapoor. Now simply called BizX, the financial technology company facilitates business-to-business exchange of goods and services using a digital private currency called BizX dollars. Before evolving into a financial technology company, the platform became the most successful trade exchange on the West Coast, and was named one of the fastest-growing companies in America seven times by Inc. Magazine.

Awards and recognition
 East Bay Business Times 40 under 40, 2004
 Entrepreneurs’ Organization San Francisco, Board Member, 2010-2014

Education
Haddawy graduated from the University of California, Berkeley with a degree in Political Economy of Industrial Societies. During his undergraduate career, he was elected president of the Sigma Pi Fraternity and became an All-American boxer in 1984.

References

External links
 BizX Website

Year of birth missing (living people)
Living people
University of California, Berkeley alumni
American business executives